Charles Glover may refer to:

Charles William Glover (1806–1863), English violinist and composer
Charles C. Glover (1846–1936), American banker and philanthropist
Charles John Glover, known as Sir John Glover, Lord Mayor of Adelaide 1960–1963, see List of mayors and lord mayors of Adelaide (son of Charles Richmond Glover) 
Charles Richmond Glover (1870–1936), last mayor and first Lord Mayor of the City of Adelaide
Charles Glover Barkla (1877–1944), British physicist